is a professional Japanese baseball player. He plays infielder for the Saitama Seibu Lions.

References 

1994 births
Living people
Baseball people from Tokyo
Japanese baseball players
Nippon Professional Baseball infielders
Saitama Seibu Lions players